The Woodbury Public Schools (WPS) is a comprehensive community public school district that serves students in pre-kindergarten through twelfth grade from Woodbury, in Gloucester County, New Jersey, United States.

As of the 2018–19 school year, the district, comprising four schools, had an enrollment of 1,550 students and 129.2 classroom teachers (on an FTE basis), for a student–teacher ratio of 12.0:1.

The district is classified by the New Jersey Department of Education as being in District Factor Group "B", the second-lowest of eight groupings. District Factor Groups organize districts statewide to allow comparison by common socioeconomic characteristics of the local districts. From lowest socioeconomic status to highest, the categories are A, B, CD, DE, FG, GH, I and J.

On March 15, 2020, the entire district closed until further notice due to the COVID-19 pandemic.

Awards and recognition

Evergreen Avenue Elementary School was recognized by Governor Jim McGreevey in 2003 as one of 25 schools selected statewide for the First Annual Governor's School of Excellence award.
Evergreen Avenue Elementary School was recognized in the 2001–02 school year as a Star School, by the New Jersey Department of Education, the highest state honor a New Jersey school can receive.
In 1998–99, the Woodbury Public Schools was recognized with the Best Practices Award by the New Jersey Department of Education for its Hollywood Kids Special Education program for students in Pre-K through 5th grade.
Woodbury Junior-Senior High School was recognized as a NASA Explorer School in 2004, one of only 50 selected in the nation to work exclusively with NASA on improving technology and science education in the school.
The Woodbury High School received the Gaston Caperton College Board Award, celebrating the "extraordinary commitment of educators and communities to their students' futures." This award is given to three schools in the nation on an annual basis.
The Woodbury Junior-Senior High School is an AVID National Demonstration school, one of approximately 125 schools out of over 4,000 AVID schools nationally.

Schools
Schools in the district (with 2018–19 enrollment data from the National Center for Education Statistics) are:
Elementary schools
Evergreen Avenue Elementary School with 291 students in grades PreK-5
Thomas Braddock, Principal
Walnut Street Elementary School with 117 students in grades PreK-5
Dr. Jeffrey Adams, Principal
West End Memorial Elementary School with 435 students in grades K-5
Katheryn Agresta, Principal
Middle / high school
Woodbury Junior-Senior High School with 680 students in grades 6-12
Dr. Jason Vivadelli, Principal

Administration
Core members of the district's administration are:
Andrew T. Bell Sr., Superintendent
Nancy L. McCabe, Business Administrator / Board Secretary

Board of education
The district's board of education, with nine members, sets policy and oversees the fiscal and educational operation of the district through its administration. As a Type II school district, the board's trustees are elected directly by voters to serve three-year terms of office on a staggered basis, with three seats up for election each year held (since 2012) as part of the November general election.

References

External links
Woodbury Public Schools

School Data for the Woodbury Public Schools, National Center for Education Statistics

Woodbury, New Jersey
New Jersey District Factor Group B
School districts in Gloucester County, New Jersey